Peter Landy (born 1943) is an Australian television presenter.

Career 
Beginning his career in the early 1960s—after attending the Jesuit Xavier College—he started with Radio 3UL, Warragul, co-ordinating horse racing and football broadcasts. He later moved to 3UZ Melbourne, where he reported and presented the news. In 1967, he moved to 3AK and also began with TV station Channel 9. In 1971, he moved to Seven Network Melbourne sport reporting. He commentated Australian rules football (VFL) games, tennis, boxing, and several Olympic Games, including rowing events.

His personal sporting achievements were in rowing and tennis.

In the 1990s, Landy returned to commentary with the Seven Network, hosting football in the late 1990s. He was also a newsreader.

He also appeared as a commentator with the Nine Network for Boxing at the 2006 Melbourne Commonwealth Games.

References 

Australian television presenters
Living people
Australian rules football commentators
People educated at Xavier College
1943 births
Date of birth missing (living people)
Boxing commentators
Australian tennis commentators